Katy Gale Chevigny (born ) is an American documentary filmmaker. She has produced or directed  more than 30 documentary films and won a number of awards for her work.

Early life and education 
Her father taught law at New York University and as of 2001 led the university's human rights clinic. Her mother taught literature at Purchase College and edited Doing Time: 25 Years of Prison Writing (1999). Chevigny graduated cum laude from Yale University

Career 
Chevigny was a social worker who started out in film in Chicago and then moved to New York City to start Big Mouth Productions in 1997 with a friend from college, Julia Pimsleur. Pimsleur left the company in 2002. As of 2004 Chevigny's partner in the company was Dallas Brennan. As of 2022 Marilyn Ness had joined the company. 

With Kirsten Johnson she co-directed Deadline (2004), which won a Thurgood Marshall Journalism Award. The film, an examination of Illinois governor George Ryan's decision to commute the death sentences of everyone awaiting execution in the state, was purchased and broadcast on Dateline NBC, a rare example of a major commercial network acquiring an independent documentary.

Chevigny directed Election Day which premiered at the South By Southwest Film Festival in 2007 and was broadcast on POV in 2008.

She co-directed with Ross Kauffman the feature-length documentary E-Team, which won Best Cinematography at the 2014 Sundance Film Festival and was released as a Netflix Original in October 2014. She produced the 2014 documentary 1971. 

She directed one of six segments of Hard Earned, which aired on Al Jazeera America in 2015 and won an Alfred I. duPont Award.

With Kimberly Reed, Chevigny co-produced Dark Money (2018). PBS purchased distribution rights to the film, planning to include it in the docu-series POV.

Other recognition 
Chevigny received a MacDowell Fellowship in 2008.

Two films she co-produced have been nominated for an Emmy, in 2020 Becoming and in 2021 Dick Johnson Is Dead, which also won the Special Jury Award for Innovation in Nonfiction Storytelling at Sundance in 2020.

Industry service 
At the International Documentary Association, she serves on the Advisory Board of the Enterprise Documentary Fund.

Film work 

 My Two Months in Harlem (2022)
 The First Step (2021)
 Dick Johnson Is Dead (2021)
 Becoming (2020)
 Charm City (2018)
 Don't Be Nice (2018)
 Dark Money (2018)
 Sasaba (2017)
 Trapped (2016)
 Cameraperson (2016)
 Hard Earned, episode 2 (2016)
 1971 (2014)
 E-Team (2014)
 The Internet Must Go (2013)
 (A)sexual (2011)
 Pushing the Elephant (2011)
 Camp Victory, Afghanistan (2010)
 The Teacher (2009)
 Election Day (2007)
 Arctic Son (2006)
 Deadline (2004)
 Journey to the West: Chinese Medicine Today (2001)
 Nuyorican Dream (2001)
 Brother Born Again (2001)
 Outside Looking In: Transracial Adoption in America (2001)
 Innocent Until Proven Guilty (2001)

Television work 

 Great Performances 
 Independent Lens 
 POV

Personal life 
Chevigny married Jonathan Chen in 2001.

In July 2011, she married Jack Smith, a prosecutor working for the U.S. Department of Justice. They have a daughter. The couple has been living in the Netherlands since 2018.

Notes

References

External links
 

American women film directors
American women film producers
People from New York City
Yale University alumni
American women documentary filmmakers
MacDowell Colony fellows
1960s births
Living people